Emydocephalus is a genus of sea snakes, also known as turtle-headed sea snakes, in the family Elapidae. Unlike most sea snakes, all species of Emydocephalus, have an absence of teeth on their dentary and palatine bones, and lack venom, making them the only non-venomous elapids. The dentary and palantine bones bear only a row of papillae. Emydocephalus does, however, bear fangs and many small pterygoid teeth. This reduced dentition is due to their diet consisting almost entirely of fish eggs.

Etymology
The generic name, Emydocephalus, is from the Greek words ὲμύς (emys) meaning "turtle", and κεφαλή (kephale) meaning "head".

Geographic range
Species of the genus Emydocephalus are found in East Asia, Southeast Asia, and Australasia.

Species
Emydocephalus has three recognized species.
Emydocephalus annulatus 
Emydocephalus ijimae 
Emydocephalus orarius

References

Further reading
Goin CJ, Goin OB, Zug GR (1978). Introduction to Herpetology, Third Edition. San Francisco: W.H. Freeman. xi + 378 pp. . (Genus Emydocephalus, p. 332).
Krefft G (1869). The Snakes of Australia; An Illustrative and Descriptive Catalogue of All the Known Species. Sydney: Thomas Richards, Government Printer. xxv + 100 pp. + Plates I-XII. (Emydocephalus, new genus, p. 92).

External links
Emydocelpahus at Life is Short, but Snakes are Long

Snake genera
Taxa named by Gerard Krefft